Guillaume Nicloux (born 3 August 1966) is a French novelist, director and actor. He is the founder of the theatre company La Troupe. He has written crime fiction and directed films for cinema and French television.

He won the Best Screenplay Award at the 2014 Tribeca Film Festival for The Kidnapping of Michel Houellebecq, a comedic interpretation of a rumoured abduction of the writer Michel Houellebecq, starring Houellebecq as himself.

His 2015 film Valley of Love was selected to compete for the Palme d'Or at the 2015 Cannes Film Festival.

Bibliography
 Zoocity (1996)
 Le Saint des seins (1996)
 C'est juste une balade américaine (1997)
 Le Destin est une putain (1998)
 Jack Mongoly (1998)
 Monsieur Chance (1998)
 Le Poulpe, le film : pour l'attendrir, faut taper dessus (1998)
 L'Honneur perdu de Georges Blesse (2000)
 Des brutes et des méchants (2001)

Filmography
Director
 Les Enfants volants (1990)
 La Vie crevée (1992, TV)
 Faut pas rire du bonheur (1994)
 Le Poulpe (1998)
 A Private Affair (2002)
 That Woman (2003)
 Le Concile de Pierre (2006)
 The Key (2007)
 La reine des connes (2009, TV)
 Virgin's Kiss (2009)
 Holiday (2010)
 L'Affaire Gordji : Histoire d'une cohabitation (2012, TV)
 The Nun (La Religieuse) (2013)
 The Kidnapping of Michel Houellebecq (L'Enlèvement de Michel Houellebecq) (2014)
 The Valley of Love (2015)
 The End (2016)
 To the Ends of the World (2018)
 Thalasso (2019)
 Twice Upon a Time (2019)
 La Tour (2022)

Actor
 I Stand Alone (Seul contre tous) (1998)
 Le Poulpe (1998)
 That Woman (2003)
 Cliente (2008)
 Turning Tide (2013)

References

External links

 

1966 births
20th-century French male actors
French crime fiction writers
French film directors
Living people
21st-century French male actors
French male film actors
French male screenwriters
French screenwriters
French-language film directors
French male novelists
20th-century French novelists
21st-century French novelists
20th-century French male writers
21st-century French male writers